The core objective of the Wilderness Risk Management Conference (WRMC) is to offer an outstanding educational experience to help adventure travel and ecotourism companies, clubs, and organizations mitigate the risks inherent in exploring, working, teaching, and recreating in wild places.

The WRMC was founded in 1994 by a collaboration of organizations that had a stake in how risk is managed in outdoor recreation and outdoor education. The founding group consisted of representatives from NOLS, Outward Bound USA, Wilderness Medical Society, Exum Mountain Guides, Association for Experiential Education, National Park Service, National Safety Network, American Alpine Club, and Outdoor Network.

Conference Topics

The WRMC covers a variety of topics that fall into a few major categories including: emergency planning and crisis response, field practices, legal considerations, program administration, and staff training and decision making. Additionally, the conference provides structured networking time to meet with other professionals working and managing field programs in the United States, Canada, and internationally.

Conference Locations

2019 - Albuquerque, New Mexico

2018 - Portland, Maine 

2016 - Salt Lake City, Utah

2015 - Portland, Oregon 

2014 - Atlanta, Georgia

2013 - Grand Teton National Park, Wyoming

2012 - Portland, Oregon

2011 - Boston, Massachusetts

2010 - Colorado Springs, Colorado

2009 - Durham, North Carolina

2008 - Grand Teton National Park, Wyoming

2007 - Banff, Alberta, Canada

2006 - Killington, Vermont

References

Wilderness Risk Management Conference

Experiential learning
Outdoor education organizations
Risk management